Bulawayo East is a constituency of the National Assembly of the Parliament of Zimbabwe. It covers the eastern part of Bulawayo. Its current MP since the 2018 election is Ilos Nyoni of the Movement for Democratic Change Alliance.

Members

Election results

References 

Parliamentary constituencies in Zimbabwe
Bulawayo